Královo Pole is a municipal district of Brno, the second largest city in the Czech Republic.

There was a village called Königsfeld - Královo Pole near Brno. A post-office was opened 30 November 1868.

Sports
The Královo Pole indoor arena closed in 1998.

References 

Brno